Two ships of the United States Navy have been named Currituck after Currituck Sound along the coasts of North Carolina and Virginia.

 , a Civil War screw steamer originally named Seneca.
 , the lead ship of the World War II era Currituck-class seaplane tenders.

Sources
 

United States Navy ship names